Parliamentary elections were held in Albania on 28 June 2009. No alliance achieved 71 deputies on its own needed to form a parliamentary majority. A coalition government was formed by the Democratic Party and Socialist Movement for Integration.

Electoral System
The 140 members of Parliament were elected in twelve multi-member constituencies analogous to the country's twelve counties. Within the constituencies, seats are elected by closed list proportional representation, with an electoral threshold of 3% for parties and 5% for alliances.

Seats are allocated to alliances using the d'Hondt system, then to political parties using the Sainte-Laguë method.

Background
Prior to the election, the electoral law was changed to a regional and proportional system. Polls from March and April 2009 saw a very close race, with both the governing Democratic Party of Albania and the opposition Socialist Party of Albania around 37%, with minor parties like the Socialist Movement for Integration, the G99 Movement, the Unity for Human Rights Party and the Republican Party of Albania in the low single digits.

Shortly before the election, the ethnic Greek Unity for Human Rights Party switched their allegiance, abandoning their alliance with the Democratic Party of Albania to join the Socialist Party of Albania. The Party for Justice and Integration, a party representing the interest of ethnic Albanians whose properties in Greece were seized after WW2, joined the coalition Alliance of Change.

Alliances
This election saw a total of 33 parties organized in four alliances, one party running on its own and one independent candidate.

 Alliance of Change (Aleance e Ndryshimit), was a center-right coalition made up from 16 parties and led by Prime Minister Sali Berisha.
Union for Change (Bashkimi për Ndryshim), was a coalition made up from 5 center-left and left winged Parties, led by that-time Mayor of Tirana Edi Rama.
Socialist Alliance for Integration (Alenaca Socialiste për Integrim), was a coalition made up from 6 center-left and liberal parties, led by former Prime Minister Ilir Meta.
Pole of Freedom (Poli i Lirisë), was a conservative coalition made up from 6 right winged parties, led by former Prime Minister Aleksander Meksi.

Results

Regional level

The electorate was split in twelve regions, in a regional proportional system, each of which elected a specific number of Members of Parliament (deputet). The following table details the regional results going from North to South.

Aftermath

Initially the PD led coalition interred into discussions about dividing up the various cabinet posts.

While it was still unclear whether the PD-led alliance held 70 or 71 seats, the leader of the Socialist Movement for Integration (LSI) announced on 4 July 2009 that he had accepted Berisha's invitation to form a government with the PD and stated he wanted to be a stabilising factor in Albania's path towards European Union membership. With the addition of the four seats from LSI, the coalition had the necessary majority to form a government. Nonetheless, in November 2010, the EU in its "Key findings of the Opinion on Albania" found that the political stalemate since the June 2009 elections was a significant barrier to Albania's candidacy for European Union membership.

References

Parliamentary elections in Albania
Albania
2009 in Albania
Albania